South Hagerstown High School is located at 1101 South Potomac Street, in Hagerstown, Maryland, United States. The current principal is Rodney Gayman. The 164,000 square-foot school is part of the Washington County Public Schools system and has an official capacity of 1240.

Background
South Hagerstown High School opened its doors in the fall of 1956. The many buildings of South High were planned by Washington, D.C. architects McLeod & Ferrara, and they were built by Norman S. Early and Son of Hagerstown. The architectural design of the school won first place in a national competition that year. The school was dedicated to the service of youth and the community. 

The South Hagerstown Indoor Percussion won the 2015 KIDA(Keystone Indoor Drill Association) Championship. This is the 5th time in 33 years and is the first win since 2000.

Organizations

Student Government Association
National Honor Society
Academic Team
Best Buddies
PTSA
Environmental Club
Robotics Club
Link Crew
Spanish National Honor Society
French Club
Indoor and Outdoor Color Guard
Marching Band
Concert Band
Anime Club
Media Club
Yearbook

Sports
South Hagerstown High School sports teams have won 4 state championships. They have won two in baseball (1996 and 2003), one in basketball (1974), and one in boys outdoor track and field (2018).

Robotics Team 
The South Hagerstown High School Robotics team began the 2012-2013 school year. It is one of the largest teams in the nation and the school hosts several competitions each year. The Rebel Robotics team has qualified for the worlds competition in 7 of 8 years since the 2015-2016 season(Only not qualifying in the 2018-2019 season). During the 2017-2018 season, one of the teams was ranked 19th in the world at one point. During the 2022-2023 season, several teams qualified for worlds, with one team(9080S - "Rebellious Misfits") winning the states competition; the first South High team to do so.

Notable alumni
 Robert A. McKee, former Maryland politician, House of Delegates (District 2A)
 Christopher B. Shank, former Maryland State Senator (District 2)
 Justin Warner, chef
 Lucas and Marcus Dobre, identical twin YouTube stars originally gaining fame from the 6-second video app, Vine

References

External links
South Hagerstown High School homepage
Washington County Public Schools Official Site

Schools in Hagerstown, Maryland
Public high schools in Maryland
Educational institutions established in 1956
Public schools in Washington County, Maryland
1956 establishments in Maryland